is the fourth single released by singer Maaya Sakamoto. It was released on April 22, 1998. "Kiseki no Umi" was used as the opening theme for Lodoss Tou Senki: Eiyuu Kishi Den. Although it debuted at number 43 in the Oricon charts, it remained her best-selling single for many years until the release of "Triangler" in 2008.

Track listing

Active heart

Charts

References

External links
 

1998 singles
1998 songs
Maaya Sakamoto songs
Victor Entertainment singles
Anime songs
Songs written by Yoko Kanno
Songs with lyrics by Yuho Iwasato